The 2013–14 Eastern Washington Eagles men's basketball team represented Eastern Washington University during the 2013–14 NCAA Division I men's basketball season. The Eagles, are led by third year head coach Jim Hayford and played their home games at Reese Court. They were members of the Big Sky Conference.

The Eagles entered the season with a new assistant coach after Craig Ehlo resigned in July.

They finished the season 15–16, 10–10 in Big Sky play to finish in a tie for seventh place. They failed to qualify for the Big Sky Conference tournament.

Roster

Schedule
 

|-
!colspan=9 style="background:#a10022; color:#FFFFFF;"| Regular season

See also
2013–14 Eastern Washington Eagles women's basketball team

References

Eastern Washington Eagles men's basketball seasons
Eastern Washington
Eastern Washington
Eastern Washington